Sven Alfred Teodor Jerring, (born Jonsson, 8 December 1895 – 27 April 1979) was a Swedish radio man who during almost 50 years worked as a presenter, sports journalist and commentator at the national Swedish broadcasting company AB Radiotjänst, in the mid-fifties renamed to Sveriges Radio.

He was married from 1929 to 1937 to book illustrator Yvonne Millde, and from 1972 until his death to nurse Barbro Wessel (1920–2007). He was the brother of actor and director Nils Jerring.

Jerring was born in Malung, Sweden, but the family moved a lot during his childhood. When he turned eleven the family moved to Vadstena, Sweden. The young Jerring has been described as a silent reclusive person that mostly liked to play. When he got older he graduated and did military service. He was stationed at Petrograd in current Saint Petersburg, Russia between 1917 and 1918. During his service the Russian October Revolution happened. In 1923 Jerring started working at Åhlén & Åkerlunds förlag; the same year he also started working for the publishing house's radio show and made his radio debut on 2 December 1923.

When Radiotjänst (now known as Sveriges Radio) started broadcasting on 1 January 1925, Jerring became its presenter and announcer. His skillful and knowledgeable reporting and sports reports became well-known and he commentated on Vasaloppet annually from 1925.

The program Barnens brevlåda had its premiere broadcast on the radio in 1925, and is one of the longest running radio programmes in Swedish history. When Jerring ended the show on 11 June 1972, 1785 episodes had already been broadcast, making it the world's longest-broadcast radio programme at the time. In 1977 he was awarded the Illis quorum.

Jerring died in Stockholm in April 1979 and was buried at Norra begravningsplatsen.

Jerringfonden and Jerringpriset
On Jerring's 60th birthday in 1955, a collection was taken up amongst friends and colleagues. Over the years so much money has been donated to the foundation that it can give away five million kronor annually in the form of scholarships and research grants.

Radiosportens Jerringpris is an annual award in Jerring's memory given to an athlete who has excelled in their sport, chosen by popular vote.

References

External links

1895 births
1979 deaths
Burials at Norra begravningsplatsen
People from Malung-Sälen Municipality
20th-century Swedish journalists
Recipients of the Illis quorum